Mecyclothorax teatara is a species of ground beetle in the subfamily Psydrinae. It was described by Perrault in 1986.

References

teatara
Beetles described in 1986